Matthew Temple may refer to:
 Matthew Temple (filmmaker)
 Matthew Temple (swimmer)